Peter Cunningham (13 July 1906 – 3 September 1934) was a Scottish footballer who played as a centre-forward for Clyde, Partick Thistle, Cork City, Barnsley, Port Vale, and Crewe Alexandra.

Career
Cunningham played for Clyde, Partick Thistle, Cork City and Barnsley, before joining Port Vale in May 1933. He played just two Second Division games before leaving The Old Recreation Ground and dropping down to the Third Division North to play for Crewe Alexandra in November 1933. He died less than a year later on 3 September 1934, at the age of 28.

Career statistics
Source:

References

Footballers from Glasgow
Scottish footballers
Association football forwards
Clyde F.C. players
Partick Thistle F.C. players
Scottish expatriate footballers
Expatriate association footballers in the Republic of Ireland
Cork City F.C. players
Barnsley F.C. players
Port Vale F.C. players
Crewe Alexandra F.C. players
Scottish Football League players
English Football League players
1906 births
1934 deaths